Villi Bossi (born 8 November 1939) is an Italian sculptor.

Born at Muggia, near Trieste, he studied at the Academy of Fine Arts in Genoa under the scholarship of Lodovico Caraventa.

He attended the "Free School of Figure" directed by Nino Perizi at the Revoltella Museum in Trieste. From 1964 on, he held several exhibits, both exclusive ones and not, showing up his ability with various materials, including different types of wood and, in particular, sandstone and marble. In 1995 a large sculpture in Laas marble of his was placed in a park of Dresden (Germany).

In 2004, Villi Bossi sculpted a large "Venetian Lyon" for the Assicurazioni Generali, which is also the logo of this major insurance company, placed in the neighbourhood of Padua, starting from a large block of stone, sized 8 cubic meters.
He took part to several International Symposia of Sculpture: Prilep (Macedonia, 1976, 1982), Lipica (Slovenia, 1980), Jockgrim (Germany, 1989), Kandel (Germany, 1993), Germersheim (Germany, 1997), Pirmasens (Germany, 1998), Portorose (Slovenia, 1999), Mostar (Bosnia and Herzegovina, 2006).
Between 1964 and 2015, he held 35 personal exhibits in Austria and in various Italian cities.
His work was reviewed by Giulio Montenero, Enzo Santese, Marianna Accerboni and Boris Petkovski, among others.

Bossi lives and works at the medieval Castle of Muggia.

Selected works
 "Friendship door" (1978, in oak wood, cm 430 high, in Kostanievica na Krka, Slovenia)
 "Lipica's horse" (1980, in limestone, cm 100 x 150 x 230, in Lipica, Slovenia)
 "Life tracks" (1987, in marble from Laas, cm 160 x 180 x 400, in Dresden, Germany)
 "Birth control" (1989, in sandstone, cm 160 x 220, in Jockgrim, Germany)
 "Towards the Life" (1995, in golden stone, cm 100 x 80 x 300)
 "Throne of Frederick II of Hohenstaufen (after 800 years of his birth)" (1995, in marble of Garfagnana, cm 300 high, in Minucciano, Italy)
 "Under the comet Hale-Bopp" (1997, in sandstone, in Germersheim, Germany)
 "River of tears over the History - Year 2000" (1998, in sandstone, cm 250 high, Park of Pirmasens, Germany)
 "The year 2000" (1999, in stone of Vicenza, cm 200 high, Piazza del Simposio, Nanto Veneto, Italy).
 "Song" (2003, in wood of plane tree, cm 20 x 62 x 39)
 "A new birth" (2003, in stone of Aurisina, cm 20 x 62 x 39)
 "Leave" (2003, in stone of Aurisina, cm 76 80 48)
 "Sprout" (2005, in marble of Aurisina, cm 130 150 190)
 "Cycle: New birth" (2006, in wood of lime tree, cm 60 60 160)
 "Sentinel" (2006, in stone of Istria, in Mostar (Herzegovina), cm 50 60 210)
 "Parallel Dialogue" (2008, in stone of Aurisina, cm 28 65 130)
 "Fertility" (2009, in stone of Aurisina, cm 35 50 48)
 "New freedom" (2010, in stone of Repen, cm 25 25 87)
 "Flower" (2011, in stone of Istria, cm 53 23 35)
 "Vortex" (2012, in wood of cherry, cm 1040 30 30)
 "Petals" (2012, in grey marble of Carnia, cm 45 60 20)
 "New birth" (2012, in marble of Carrara, cm 30 30 70)
 "Fir seeds" (2013, in marble of Carrara, cm 32 23 21.

References

1939 births
Living people
People from Muggia
20th-century Italian sculptors
Italian male sculptors
21st-century Italian sculptors
20th-century Italian male artists
21st-century Italian male artists